Komlan Agbégniadan (also known as Platini) is a Togolese international footballer who plays as a forward and midfielder for Ivory Coast Ligue 1 side ASEC Mimosas.

He had previously played for Ghanaian Premier League side WAFA from 15 May 2016, after he had been with Togolese Championnat National side AS Togo-Port.

He was a member of the Togo 2017 Africa Cup of Nations squad.

International career

International goals
Scores and results list Togo's goal tally first.

References 

1991 births
Living people
Togolese footballers
Togo international footballers
2017 Africa Cup of Nations players
ASEC Mimosas players
Togolese expatriate footballers
Expatriate footballers in Ivory Coast
Togolese expatriate sportspeople in Ivory Coast
Association football forwards
AS Togo-Port players
21st-century Togolese people